The Paschal trikirion is a liturgical triple-candlestick used at Easter time in the Eastern Orthodox and Byzantine Catholic traditions.

Liturgical use
The paschal trikirion is not mentioned in the liturgical books of the Eastern Orthodox Church; indeed, both the Pentecostarion and the Typicon dictate the celebrant carry a cross in his left hand when, in contemporary practice, the paschal trikirion is also carried.

The paschal trikirion is held by the serving priest (whether a bishop or a presbyter) in contrast to the bishop's trikirion which the bishop uses for blessing and is held or carried alongside the bishop.  It is used from the commencement of the celebration of the Resurrection during the Paschal Vigil through the end of Bright Week, and also on the Apodosis of Pascha, when it is used at sundry times, in particular, while chanting the paschal verses at the beginning of Vespers, Matins and the Divine Liturgy, while censing, during the Little Entrance, and when giving the paschal greeting.

Deacon's candle
As specified in the liturgical books the Pentecostarion and the Typicon, deacons also carry a candle throughout the paschal services. The deacon's candle is a single large candle which he carries in his left hand while reciting ektenias (litanies), while censing, and at other times when his hands are not otherwise occupied. It is also often decorated with fresh flowers. In the Slavic tradition, this candle may be red.

See also
Dikirion and trikirion
Paschal candle

References

External links
Russian Orthodox bishop carrying a paschal trikirion (photo)
Deacons carrying Paschal candles (plus back-view of a paschal trikirion)

Byzantine Rite
Eastern Christian liturgical objects
Eastertide
Christian religious objects
Candles